Garra smarti is a species of cyprinid fish in the genus Garra from Oman. The specific name honours Emma Smart for her studies of the fish faunas of the wadis of the Arabian Peninsula. The original specific name smarti was amended to smartae to reflect the correct gender of the person being honoured.

References

Garra
Fish described in 2009